Vico Consorti (1902–1979) was an Italian sculptor who built the bronze Holy Door in St. Peter's Basilica in 1950. In 1980, a year after his death, he received an award from the city of Grosseto for artistic merits.

Biography 
Consorti was born in Semproniano, in southern Tuscany in 1902. From 1919 to 1926, he took a sculpturing course in the Art Institute of Siena. Shortly after the end of World War One, Consorti met Guido Chigi-Saracini, when he decided to move to Siena, a city he knew well.

Holy Door 
The Holy Door (built 1950), was built by Vico at St. Peter's Basilica. The door was consecrated and opened on 24 December 1949. It was ordered by Pope Pius XII.

The door is only opened during the presence of the Pope during the Jubilee years.

References

1902 births
1979 deaths
People from the Province of Grosseto
20th-century Italian sculptors
20th-century Italian male artists
Italian male sculptors